Sayyed Muhammad Mazahar Ali Akbar Naqvi (born 1 September 1960) is a Pakistani jurist who is serving as Justice of Supreme Court of Pakistan since 16 March 2020. He previously served as Judge of the Lahore High Court before his elevation to the Supreme Court. 

It has been claimed by Pakistani journalists that his appointment to the Supreme Court was on the basis of seniority list and merit, moreover, he is a very articulate judge with immense experience at his back and has served with integrity from the very day he took office. 

Honorable Justice Naqvi has given remarkable judgements against the house of sharif, famously called the Sicilian mafia of Pakistan by the then Chief Justice of Pakistan.

Early life

Naqvi was born on 1 September 1960 in Gujranwala city located in Punjab province of Pakistan.

Judicial career

Naqvi has served as inspection judge of Okara District and Gujrat District. He has been an advocate of the high court since 1988 and then went on to become an advocate of the Supreme Court of Pakistan in 2001. He was appointed as the justice of the Lahore High Court on 19 February 2010. Naqvi is also a member of visiting faculty at Punjab Judicial Academy. In 2013, his decision to grant bail to an accused after rejecting previous two pleas for the same became the reason for a 2014 judgement by Supreme Court of Pakistan in which it issued detailed guidelines for high court judges and magistrates regarding future bail applications. In 2016, he was subject to a show-cause notice from Supreme Judicial Council of Pakistan (SJC) due to an alleged misconduct. Naqvi filed a petition challenging the jurisdiction of SJC terming its "rules against the spirit of constitution”. In the same year, his seniority was changed and he was made senior to Muhammad Farrukh Irfan Khan by then chief justice of Lahore High Court Syed Mansoor Ali Shah but that decision was suspended by the supreme court of Pakistan. In 2017, he heard the case to make the model town massacre case report public and directed the Punjab government to do so in result of that hearing. In November 2017, he was taken off of the Punjab Saaf Paani Company case which was pending in his court. Raising an objection to that, he excused himself from hearing another case which was against the detention of Hafiz Saeed saying "I'm not going to hear this case, How the judiciary could work independently in such circumstances. Interference in judicial work is very awful." In 2018, he was member of the bench hearing a case against former Prime Minister of Pakistan Nawaz Sharif and his daughter Maryam Nawaz in which both of them were accused of making anti-judiciary speeches. During the hearing of that case, Naqvi had a heated argument with the lawyer of the accused over the latter's objection on inclusion of a judge in the bench who was formerly associated with Pakistan Tehreek-e-Insaf. As a result of that case, the bench ordered Pakistan Electronic Media Regulatory Authority to stop airing the anti-judiciary speeches of Nawaz Sharif and other Pakistan Muslim League (N) leaders. He also headed the bench which sent Waseem Akhtar Shaikh to jail for one month for organizing an anti-judiciary rally. Naqvi headed the contempt of court case against former federal cabinet minister Ahsan Iqbal. Naqvi also headed the bench hearing the case of Preston Institute of Management Science and Technology's students against non-confirmation of their degrees and issued an order to put university's owner on Exit Control List. He was also part of the full bench which heard the contempt of court case against president of Multan branch of Lahore High Court Bar Association, Sher Zaman Qureshi, ordering his arrest which resulted in a riot by lawyers. When Fawad Chaudhry was disqualified from contesting 2018 Pakistani general election by an election tribunal, the bench headed by Naqvi suspended that decision and allowed Chaudhry to contest the election. He was also head of the bench which allowed former prime minister Shahid Khaqan Abbasi to contest the 2018 election from NA-57 (Rawalpindi-I) after he was too disqualified by an election tribunal. During a case against Shahid Khaqan Abbasi, Naqvi issued bailable arrest warrants for Abbasi when he did not appear in the court on 10 September 2018.

References

1960 births
Living people
Judges of the Lahore High Court
Pakistani judges
Justices of the Supreme Court of Pakistan